Anastasia Alexandrovna Platonova (born 28 August 1986) is a Russian former competitive ice dancer. With Alexander Grachev, she is a two-time (2008–2009) Finlandia Trophy silver medalist and 2008 NRW Trophy champion. With Andrei Maximishin, she is the 2006 Karl Schäfer Memorial silver medalist and won three gold medals on the ISU Junior Grand Prix series.

Career 
Early in her career, Platonova competed with Dmitri Ponomarev.

Platonova competed with Andrei Maximishin from 2003 to 2007. They placed 6th at the 2005 World Junior Championships and 5th in 2006, as well as competing twice at the ISU Junior Grand Prix Final. Platonova and Maximishin placed 5th at 2006 Skate Canada International, their senior Grand Prix debut. They parted ways due to Platonova's back problem. They were coached by Alexei Gorshkov in Odintsovo.

After recuperating from her back issues, Platonova teamed up with Alexander Grachev. They were coached initially by Elena Kustarova and Svetlana Alexeeva in Moscow. In the summer of 2009, they switched to Alexander Zhulin and Oleg Volkov. They decided to retire from competition in 2010.

Programs

With Grachev

With Maximishin

Competitive highlights 
GP: Grand Prix; JGP: Junior Grand Prix

With Grachev

With Maximishin

With Ponomarev

References

External links 

 
 

Living people
Russian female ice dancers
Figure skaters at the 2007 Winter Universiade
Figure skaters from Moscow
1986 births
Medalists at the 2007 Winter Universiade
Universiade medalists in figure skating
Universiade silver medalists for Russia